The men's 4×200 metre freestyle relay at the 2009 World Championships took place on July 31, 2009 at the Foro Italico in Rome, Italy. 30 countries entered the event, of which 27 swam.

Records
Prior to this competition, the existing world and competition records were as follows:

The following records were established during the competition:

Results

Heats

Final

See also
Swimming at the 2008 Summer Olympics – Men's 4 × 200 metre freestyle relay

References

Freestyle relay Men 4x200